Eucalyptus argophloia, commonly known as Queensland western white gum, Queensland white gum, scrub gum, lapunyah, Burncluith gum or Chinchilla white gum is a tree that is endemic to a small area of Queensland. It has smooth white bark ageing to other colours, narrow lance-shaped adult leaves, more or less spherical flower buds in groups of seven, white flowers and small, hemispherical to cup-shaped fruit.

Description
The leaves are the same glossy green on both sides. Flowering occurs in May and June and the flowers are white.

Taxonomy and naming
Eucalyptus argophloia was first formally described in 1934 by William Blakely and the description was published in his book A key to the Eucalypts from a specimen collected near Burncluith north of Chinchilla. The specific epithet (argophloia) refers to the bark of this tree species.

Distribution and habitat
Queensland white gum has a limited range and is known only from a small area north east of Chinchilla where it grows in brown to black clay or clay-loam soils. The number of populations and the total number of plants is unknown. It is often found in association with brigalow (Acacia harpophylla) or Eucalyptus microcarpa on flat terrain in areas that were once open forest.

Conservation
This eucalypt is classified as "vulnerable" under the Australian Government Environment Protection and Biodiversity Conservation Act 1999 and under the Queensland Government Nature Conservation Act 1992. The main threat to the species is habitat destruction caused by land clearing and grazing.

Uses
It produces deep red timber, which is strong hard and durable. It is one of the species selected for improvement under the New Zealand Dryland Forestry Initiative.

See also
List of Eucalyptus species

References

argophloia
Trees of Australia
Myrtales of Australia
Flora of Queensland
Plants described in 1934